Puja Joshi (Born-28 June 1992) is an Indian television actress. She is best known for her role of Charu Shashtri in Gujarati SitCom Aa Family Comedy Che which aired on Colors Gujarati and for her role as Kumkum in Colors Gujarati show named Kumkum Na pagla Padya.

She has done many Hindi television shows as well, such as Kaal Bhairav Rahasya on Star Bharat, Channel V's The Buddy Project along with TV stars like Manav Gohil, Gargi Patel and many more. She also has featured in the promotional advertise of Sony Pal and Star Movies India.

Early life and education
Puja Joshi was born and brought up in Mumbai. She comes from the family of a defence background and her father served in Indian Air Force. Puja has done her graduation from Mithibai College, Mumbai in Biotechnology.

Television

Filmography

Web series

Music videos

Awards & nominations
Awards and nominations include:

References

External links 
 
 

Living people
Indian television actresses
Actresses from Mumbai
1992 births